Mbe is a town and commune in Cameroon.

See also
Communes of Cameroon

References

Populated places in Adamawa Region
Communes of Cameroon